Chinantla  is a village in Chinantla Municipality of the state of Puebla, Mexico. It is situated in the southeastern part of the state, and lies some 220 km (136.7mi) from the city of Puebla, the state's capital.

External links
Chinantla.com
www.chinantla.gob.mx
Populated places in Puebla